Tephritis pulchra is a species of tephritid or fruit flies in the genus Tephritis of the family Tephritidae.

Distribution
Central & south Europe to Turkey, North Africa.

References

Tephritinae
Insects described in 1844
Diptera of Africa
Diptera of Asia
Diptera of Europe